The Krnjeuša massacre, sometimes referred to as the Krnjeuša pogrom (Croatian: Pogrom u Krnjeuši), was a massacre of Croat civilians committed by local Serb rebels led by Mane Rokvić on 9-10 August 1941, during the Drvar uprising.

The rebels were primarily Chetniks. The manner in which the massacre was committed suggests it was done in retaliation for earlier massacres committed by the Ustaša.

The Roman Catholic parish of Krnjeuša, established as Parish of Zelinovac in 1892, was a parish of the Diocese of Banja Luka which encompassed 10 settlements (Krnjeuša, lastve, Vranovina, Risovac, Vođenica, Vrtoče, Bjelaj, Teočak, Prkose and Cimeše) in the area near to Bosanski Petrovac numbering around 1,300 believers. 

The massacre, which started on 9 August 1941, caused the total destruction of the parish. The church, the rectory and majority of houses in parish was burned and demolished. So far, the identity of 240 killed civilians is known including a 34-year-old parish priest, Krešimir Barišić, who was tortured and burned alive. Among those killed were 49 children under the age of 12. After the massacre the local Croats fled and the communist authorities refused to allow exiles to return after the war ended in 1945.

See also
Trubar massacre
Bosansko Grahovo massacre
Roman Catholic Diocese of Banja Luka

References

Sources
Anto Orlovac: Hommage uništenom zavičaju, članak iz Hrvatskog slova od 6. travnja 2007., str. 22.
Ana Došen: Krnjeuša u srcu i sjećanju, Matica hrvatska, ogranak Rijeka, Rijeka, 1994; 
Ana Došen: To je bilo onda, Vlastita naklada, Zagreb, 2007; 
Josip Jurjević: Pogrom u Krnjeuši 9. i 10. kolovoza 1941.', Vikarijat Banjalučke biskupije, Zagreb, 1999; 

Krnjeuša
Massacres in Bosnia and Herzegovina
Krnjeuša
Krnjeuša
1941 murders in Europe
Religious persecution by communists
Massacres of Croats
Pogroms